Thomas Dillon (1950–2011) was an American serial killer.

Thomas or Tom Dillon may also refer to:

 Thomas Dillon (judge) (c. 1535–1606), Irish judge and landowner
 Thomas Dillon, 4th Viscount Dillon (1615–1673), Irish peer
 Thomas Dillon (chemist) (1886–1971), Irish chemist and nationalist
 Thomas Dillon (politician), Australian politician
 Tom Dillon (rugby union) (born 1983), English rugby union footballer
 Tom Dillon (Australian footballer) (1920–2007), Australian rules footballer
 Tom Dillon (Gaelic footballer) (1926–2019), Irish Gaelic footballer